The following below is a list of current NBA G League rosters.

Eastern Conference
There are a total of 15 teams in the Eastern Conference.

Capital City Go-Go

Cleveland Charge

College Park Skyhawks

Delaware Blue Coats

Fort Wayne Mad Ants

Grand Rapids Gold

Greensboro Swarm

Lakeland Magic

Long Island Nets

Maine Celtics

Motor City Cruise

Raptors 905

Westchester Knicks

Windy City Bulls

Wisconsin Herd

Western Conference
There are a total of 15 teams in the Western Conference.

Agua Caliente Clippers

Austin Spurs

Birmingham Squadron

Capitanes de Ciudad de México

Iowa Wolves

Memphis Hustle

NBA G League Ignite

Oklahoma City Blue

Rio Grande Valley Vipers

Salt Lake City Stars

Santa Cruz Warriors

Sioux Falls Skyforce

South Bay Lakers

Stockton Kings

Texas Legends

References
G League Rosters

Development League Roster
NBA G League team rosters